Mohammad Reza Shakourzadeh  is an Iranian football defender who played for Iran in the 1984 Asian Cup. He also played for Shahin F.C.

International Records

Honours 

Asian Cup:
Fourth Place : 1984

External links
Team Melli Stats

Living people
Iranian footballers
Esteghlal F.C. players
Place of birth missing (living people)
Year of birth missing (living people)
Association football defenders